What a Life is the debut extended play by Exo-SC, the second official sub-unit of the South Korean–Chinese boy group Exo. It was released on July 22, 2019 by SM Entertainment. The EP features six tracks, including three singles.

Background and release
On June 5, 2019, it was revealed that Chanyeol and Sehun would be debuting as Exo's second sub-unit and were preparing to release an album in July. On June 28, the EP's title and number of songs were revealed. On July 9, an instrumental teaser of one of the singles was released by W Korea following the duo's photo shoot for the magazine. On July 11, the album details were released on Exo's social media accounts. On July 12, it was revealed that the EP will feature three singles, and that it was produced by Dynamic Duo's Gaeko and Devine Channel. On July 15, it was revealed that the duo participated in writing and producing the album, and that the message of the EP is for youth. On July 17, three videos of the duo with Gaeko and Divine Channel were released where they talked about the making of the album. On the same day, a teaser of the music videos for the three singles was released. On July 20, a highlight medley video for the album was released, On the same day, the music video for "Just us 2" was released prior to the album's release. On July 22, the official music video for "What a Life" was released. On July 25, a video of Sehun and Chanyeol shooting What a Life was released. On July 26, the official music video for "Closer to You" was released. On July 29, a jacket making video of the duo was released.

Composition and production

"What a Life" is described as a hip hop track with a "unique" plucking sound and lyrics containing a message of both working and playing happily.

"Just Us 2" is a hip hop song featuring piano instrumentation, soft synthesizers and a melodious chorus, with lyrics about vacationing in a hot summer spot. The track features rapper Gaeko and was composed by the South Korean artist Gray. The lyrics of the song were written by Boi B, Chanyeol and Sehun.

"Closer to You" is a hip hop R&B song with romantic sensibility. It features an emotional melody and a "highly addictive" chorus, with lyrics expressing the desire to be closer to a person. Chanyeol and Sehun participated in writing the lyrics with hip hop group Rhythm Power member Hangzoo.

Promotion
Exo-SC performed "What a Life" and "Closer to You" for the first time on Exo's 5th concert Exo Planet 5 – Exploration on July 19, and will continue to do so for all the concerts in the tour.

Exo-SC held a press showcase event on July 22 at MUV Hall in Seogyo-dong, Mapo-gu, Seoul. On the same day, they held a showcase for the fans with Gaeko where they talked about the album, the process of making it and performed "What a Life", "Just Us 2" and "Closer to You".

On July 25, Exo-SC held a live stream show on the Chinese website Sina Weibo, where they recorded 2.11M concurrent viewers, becoming the first Korean artists to do so.

They received their first-ever music show win since debut on August 2, 2019 on KBS's Music Bank. On August 8, Exo-SC held a promotion event in Gwangjang-dong.

Commercial performance
Sales of What a Life on QQ Music exceeded 1M yuan, and it received a Platinum record certification.

Track listing

Charts

Weekly charts

Year-end charts

Accolades

Music program awards

Sales

Release history

References

2019 debut EPs
SM Entertainment EPs
Korean-language EPs
IRiver EPs